GA General Automation was an American company, founded in 1968 by Larry Goshorn (a former marketing executive and a salesman from Honeywell), which manufactured minicomputers and industrial controllers.

Products
GA SPC-12 (Jan 1968)
Priced at $6400 and claiming $4,000 worth of free options
Totally integrated, binary, parallel, single address processor
4,096 words (8 bit bytes) of memory with a 2.2 microsecond cycle time
Shared command concept that permits the SPC-12s 8-bit memory to handle 12-bit instructions.
Features included a real-time clock, expandable memory to 16K, a teletype interface, a control panel and a priority interrupt
GA SPC-8 (Nov 1968)
GA 18/30 (June 1968, IBM 1800 compatible)
GA SPC-16/30, /50 & /70 (November 1971)
GA SPC-16/40, /45, /65 & /85 (January 1972)
LSI-12/16 (January 1974)
These computers were initially produced with silicon on sapphire circuit technology provided by Rockwell International but yield problems caused a switch to conventional ICs by 1975.
GA 16/110 & /120 (December 1976)
GA 16/220 (July 1978)
GA 16/330
GA 16/440
GA 16/460
GA Zebra 1700/1750 (Introduced in 1985, a Motorola 68000 computer running Pick Operating System)
Parallel Computers, Inc. – fault-tolerant supermicro/minicomputer based on Unix, acquired 1987, sold 1988

References

External links
Computer History Museum
Documents at Bitsavers
18/30 Fortran IV Software Data Sheet

Minicomputers
Defunct computer companies of the United States
Defunct manufacturing companies based in California
Defunct technology companies based in California
Companies based in Anaheim, California
Computer companies established in 1968
Technology companies established in 1968
1968 establishments in California